Jaren Hall (born March 24, 1998) is an American football quarterback for the BYU Cougars.

High school career
Hall attended Maple Mountain High School in Spanish Fork, Utah. During his career he had 5,109 passing yards and 52 touchdowns. He committed to  Brigham Young University (BYU) to play college football.

College career
Hall played in two games his first year at BYU in 2018 and took a redshirt. He played in seven games and made two starts as a backup to Zach Wilson. He became the first black quarterback to start a game for BYU, when he started in place of Wilson against South Florida. For the season, he completed 31 of 46 passes for 420 yards with one touchdown. After taking a medical redshirt in 2020, Hall took over as the starter in 2021. He completed 189 of 296 passes for 2,583 yards, 20 touchdowns and five interceptions.

Hall also played for BYU's baseball team in 2019 and 2020.

Statistics

Baseball

References

External links
BYU Cougars bio

Living people
Players of American football from Texas
American football quarterbacks
BYU Cougars football players
BYU Cougars baseball players
African-American players of American football
1998 births